Theodore Lettvin (October 29, 1926 – August 24, 2003) was an American concert pianist and conductor. He was one of the four children of Solomon and Fannie Lettvin, two Jewish-Ukrainian immigrants who settled in Chicago.  Neurophysiologist and MIT professor Jerome Lettvin was his eldest brother.

Biography
Lettvin's first concert was at the age of five at the Lyon & Healy in Chicago. On March 15, 1939, he appeared as a soloist with the Chicago Symphony Orchestra under conductor Frederick Stock, performing the first movement of Mendelssohn's Piano Concerto no. 1. As a teenager, he was accepted as a scholarship student of Rudolf Serkin and Mieczysław Horszowski at the Curtis Institute of Music in Philadelphia. In his twenties, he won the Michaels Memorial Award, First Prize in the Queen Elisabeth of Belgium International Piano Competition. He made his European debut touring France with violinist Sidney Harth in 1951-1952 in a concert series organized by the National Music League and the Jeunesses Musicales International.
 
Lettvin performed with the New York Philharmonic, and the symphony orchestras of Boston, Chicago, Cleveland, Washington, Atlanta, Vienna, Tel Aviv, and Tokyo. He also participated in the summer festivals at Tanglewood, Ravina, Saratoga, Sarasota, Salzburg and Interlochen.

Prior to his appointment as Professor Emeritus by Rutgers University and the University of Michigan, Lettvin was a Distinguished Professor in their music departments where he directed their Doctor of Musical Arts and Artist Diploma programs. Before joining these universities, Lettvin was on the faculty of the New England Conservatory of Music, the Cleveland Music School Settlement, and Artist in Residence at the University of Colorado Boulder.

He died in August 2003. A concert series in Bradford, New Hampshire is named in his honour.

Discography

References

External links

 Theodore Lettvin collection at the International Piano Archives at Maryland (accessed 12 Jul 2013)
 Music Library at The Colburn School of Music 
 A website with some information about Lettvin
 Theodore Lettvin tours Southern Africa 1974. Photo dedicated to tour organiser Hans Adler.

American male conductors (music)
American classical pianists
Male classical pianists
American male pianists
American male composers
American music educators
Piano pedagogues
University of Colorado faculty
University of Michigan faculty
Rutgers University faculty
1926 births
2003 deaths
20th-century classical pianists
20th-century American pianists
20th-century American composers
Curtis Institute of Music alumni
20th-century American conductors (music)
20th-century American male musicians
American people of Ukrainian-Jewish descent
 Jewish classical pianists